The Majority Leader is the leader of the parliamentary delegation of the largest party in the National Assembly of Cambodia. Though not directly the head of government, the Majority Leader acts as the leader of the members of parliament from the ruling party. It is similar to the Leader of the House of Commons in the Westminster system.

The only Majority Leader was Sar Kheng. The position was abolished by Parliament on 31 January 2017.

List of majority leaders

References

Government of Cambodia
Cambodia politics-related lists